A chromogenic print, also known as a C-print or C-type print, a silver halide print, or a dye coupler print, is a photographic print made from a color negative, transparency or digital image, and developed using a chromogenic process. They are composed of three layers of gelatin, each containing an emulsion of silver halide, which is used as a light-sensitive material, and a different dye coupler of subtractive color which together, when developed, form a full-color image.

History 

Developing color by using oxidized developers was first suggested by German chemist Benno Homolka who, in 1907, successfully developed insoluble indigo-blue and red dyes on a latent image by oxidizing indoxyl and thio-indoxyl respectively. He additionally noted these developers could create beautiful photographic effects.

The potential of oxidized developers in a color photographic process however, was first realized by another German chemist, Rudolf Fischer, who, in 1912, filed a patent describing a chromogenic process to develop both positives and negatives using indoxyl, and thio-indoxyl-based color developers as dye couplers in a light-sensitive silver halide emulsion. The following year he filed a patent listing various color developers and dye couplers, which have historically been used in Agfachrome and are still in use today in Fujichrome Velvia and Provia, and Ektachrome. In spite of this, Fischer never created a successful color print due to his inability to prevent the dye couplers from moving between the emulsion layers.

This first solution to this problem, found by Agfa workers Gustav Wilmanns and Wilhelm Schneider, who created a print made of three layers of gelatin containing subtractive color dye couplers made of long hydrocarbon chains, and carboxylic or sulfonic acid. This turned the dye couplers into micelles which can easily be scattered in the gelatin while loosely tethering to it.:698 Agfa patented both the developer for this print and its photographic process, and promptly developed and released in 1936 Agfacolor Neu, the first chromogenic print, which was a color print film that could be developed using a transparency.:698 Agfa developed a chromogenic negative film by 1939, which could be developed directly on a companion paper to the film, although this film was never commercialized.

Kodak too worked to solve the issue of the dye couplers movement, and found a different solution. They used ionic insoluble carbon chains which were shorter than Agfa's for their dye couplers, which were suspended within droplets of water in the gelatin layers of the print. In 1942, Kodak released Kodacolor, the first published chromogenic color print film that could be developed from a negative. It became the cheaper and simpler to develop counterpart to the alternatives at the time, and could be used in the simplest of cameras.

Due to their simple development process and their cheap price, chromogenic printing became wildly popular in amateur photography, and by the 1960s it overtook black and white printing in the amateur photofinishing market.

In 1955, Kodak introduced a chromogenic paper named "Type C", which was the first color negative paper Kodak sold to other labs and individual photographers. Although the paper's name was changed to "Kodak Ektacolor Paper" in 1958, the terminology "Type-C Print" persisted, and has become a popular term for chromogenic prints made from negatives still in use today, with the name "Type-R Print" becoming its reversal film counterpart.

Notwithstanding the success of chromogenic prints in the amateur and professional market, it wasn't considered a medium for fine-art photography up to the 1970s. The pioneers in the use of chromogenic prints and in the use of color photography as a whole in fine-art were photographers such as Ernst Haas, which was profiled by the Museum of Modern Art in its first exhibition of color photography in 1962.:257 Other pioneering fine-art color photographers who printed their photographs on chromogenic prints include William Eggleston:251 and Stephen Shore. Their works, and those of many others, caused chromogenic prints to become the preferred medium for contemporary photography by the 1990s.

Chromogenic prints made from negatives became obsolete with the release of chromogenic digital prints, which have become the most common photographic print today.

Development of prints 

Chromogenic processes are characterized by a reaction between two chemicals to create the color dyes that make up a print. After exposure, the silver image is developed (or reduced) by a color developer. In its reaction to the print, the color developer is oxidized in the areas of exposed silver, and subsequently reacts with another chemical, the dye coupler, which is present throughout the emulsion. Different dye couplers are used in each of the three layers, so the reaction forms a different colored dye in each layer. Responding to both exposure and development, a blue-light-sensitive layer forms yellow dye, a green-light-sensitive layer forms magenta dye, and a red-light-sensitive layer forms cyan dye. The remaining silver and silver compounds are then bleached out, leaving a color image composed of dyes in three layers. The exposure of a chromogenic print may be accomplished with a traditional photographic enlarger using color filters to adjust the color balance of the print.

The print's name is derived from the chromogenic reaction between the dye coupler and the oxidized color developer.

Chromogenic print today 

Chromogenic prints, like most color photographic prints, are developed using the RA-4 process. , the major lines of professional chromogenic print paper are Kodak Endura and Fujifilm Crystal Archive. Plastic chromogenic "papers" such as Kodak Duratrans and Duraclear are used for producing backlit advertising and art.

Reversal film prints

A reversal film chromogenic print, also known as a Type-R print, is a positive-to-positive photographic print made on reversal-type color photographic paper.

Fujifilm, Kodak, and Agfa have historically manufactured paper and chemicals for the R-3 process, a chromogenic process for making Type-R prints. , all of these companies have ceased to produce Type R paper, although Fujifilm still has some stocks remaining.

Another positive-to-positive process is Ilfochrome, which is sometimes also referred to as a Type-R process. Ilfochrome is a dye destruction process, with materials, processing, and results quite different from the R-3 process.

Digital chromogenic prints 

A digital chromogenic print, sometimes known as digital Type-C print, Lambda print or LightJet print, is a chromogenic print made from a digital file rather than a negative, and exposed using digital exposure systems such as the Durst Lambda, Océ LightJet and ZBE Chromira. The LightJet and the Lambda both use RGB lasers to expose light-sensitive material to produce a latent image that is then developed using conventional silver-based photographic chemicals. The Chromira uses light-emitting diodes (LEDs) instead of lasers. All of the aforementioned printers utilize ICC color profiles to achieve color and density accuracy and also to correct paper sensitivity errors. The same technology can also be used to produce digital silver gelatin bromide black and white prints.

References

Photographic processes